Wayne Dennis (born July 22, 1940) was a Canadian football player who played for the Winnipeg Blue Bombers #63 and BC Lions #52. He won the Grey Cup with the Lions in 1964. He played college football at University of Montana-Missoula for the Montana Grizzlies.

References

1940 births
BC Lions players
Canadian players of American football
Living people
University of Montana alumni
Montana Grizzlies football players
Players of Canadian football from British Columbia
Canadian football people from Vancouver